In 1962, the United States established diplomatic relations with Burundi when it gained its independence from Belgium. Following independence, the country experienced political assassinations, ethnic violence, and cyclical periods of armed conflict; several governments were installed through coups. The 2000 Arusha Peace and Reconciliation Agreement provided a negotiated settlement framework that, along with later ceasefire agreements, led to the end of the 1993-2006 civil war. President Pierre Nkurunziza's decision to seek a third presidential term in 2015 sparked protests in the capital and was followed by a failed coup d’état. The resultant violence and political and economic crises resulted in massive refugee flows to neighboring countries.
The United States Embassy in Burundi's policy states: "The United States supports the achievement of long-term stability and prosperity in Burundi through broad, inclusive reconciliation; humanitarian assistance; economic growth; and the promotion of political openness and expansion of democratic freedoms. The United States supports the East African Community (EAC)-facilitated Burundian dialogue and other conflict resolution efforts within Burundi. The United States seeks to facilitate Burundi's deeper integration into regional and international markets, as a means to promote sustainable economic development."

Official U.S. Government goals in Burundi are "to help the people of Burundi realize a just and lasting peace based upon democratic principles and sustainable economic development." The United States encourages political stability, ongoing democratic reforms, political openness, respect for human rights, and economic development in Burundi. In the long term, the United States seeks to strengthen the process of internal reconciliation and democratization within all the states of the region to promote a stable, democratic community of nations that will work toward mutual social, economic, and security interests on the continent.

In 2011, the US sent a military aid package worth $45 million to Burundi and Uganda, which included four drone aircraft.

Relations severely deteriorated in 2015 when Nkurunziza ran and won for a third term and Burundi faced sanctions by Barack Obama and under the Donald Trump administration, threatens to close its embassy in Bujumbura.

Principal U.S. officials 

 Ambassador – Anne S. Casper, August 2016 – May 2019 (currently vacant)

Diplomatic missions 
The U.S. Embassy is located in Bujumbura. The Embassy of the Republic of Burundi to the United States is in Washington, which Donald Trump threatened to close if Nkurunziza supported Russia while he was president.

See also 
 Foreign relations of Burundi
 Foreign relations of the United States
 U.S. Ambassador to Burundi

References 

https://bi.usembassy.gov/our-relationship/policy-history/

External links
 History of Burundi - U.S. relations

 
Bilateral relations of the United States
United States